The Union-Philanthropic (Literary) Society (UPLS) is a college literary society at Hampden-Sydney College in Hampden-Sydney, Virginia founded in 1789.

The Union-Philanthropic Society currently meets in the Brinkley House, a 1920s era home that was previously the residence of longtime Critic and former President of the Society, John L. Brinkley '59.

External links 
Union-Philanthropic Society homepage

Organizations based in Virginia
Debating societies
College literary societies in the United States